Hakkı Atun (born 7 October 1935) is a former Prime Minister of the Turkish Republic of Northern Cyprus. He held this office between 1994 and 1996. He was born in Famagusta in 1935.
In 1959, he graduated from Istanbul Technical University as an engineer architect. He studied urban planning at Manchester and Nottingham Universities. In 1961–1975, he held various public positions. In 1963, he became the Regional Director of Limassol-Paphos Planning, in 1967 became the Head of the Planning and Construction Department, and in 1975, the Undersecretary of Housing.

In the General Elections of 1976, 1981, 1985, 1990, he was elected as a Nicosia MP from the National Unity Party and served as the Minister of Settlement and Rehabilitation, the Ministry of Finance, the Ministry of National Education Culture, Youth and Sports and the Secretary General of the National Unity Party. In 1983, he became a member of the constituent assembly and served as the Minister of Settlement in the first Republican Government. From 1985 to 1993, he served as Speaker of the Assembly of the Republic.

In 1992, he was elected President of the Democratic Party , which was formed as a result of the Movement he led with 9 MPs within the National Unity Party . He was elected as a Member of Parliament from the Democratic Party in the 1993 General Elections and served as Prime Minister until 16 August 1996 in the Coalition Governments of the Democratic Party-Republican Turkish Party. On 4 October 1996, he was re-elected as the Speaker of the Assembly of the Republic.

Later, he did not take part in the parliament. He is the Honorary President of DP. He speaks English and a little Greek. He is married and has two children. He is the son of the aunt of the 3rd President of TRNC Derviş Eroğlu .

References

1935 births
Living people
20th-century prime ministers of Northern Cyprus
People from Famagusta
National Unity Party (Northern Cyprus) politicians
Democratic Party (Northern Cyprus) politicians
Prime Ministers of Northern Cyprus
Finance ministers of Northern Cyprus
Speakers of the Assembly of Northern Cyprus
Members of the Assembly of the Republic (Northern Cyprus)
Istanbul Technical University alumni
Alumni of the University of Manchester
Alumni of the University of Nottingham